Francis John (Frank) Wiercinski (born November 19, 1956) is a retired United States Army officer who was the Commander United States Army Pacific (USARPAC). Wiercinski joined the United States Army in 1979.

On December 20, 1989, then Captain Wiercinski, Company Commander of Bravo Company, 3/75 Ranger Regiment, led his rangers during a night-time combat jump into Rio Hato, Panama during Operation Just Cause, assisting in the regiment's successful seizure of the airfield.

He was previously the Deputy Commander for Support, of the Multinational Division North, Iraq. The troops under his command were responsible for a large part of Iraq, stretching from Baghdad to the Turkish border, and east and west to the borders of Iran and Syria.

During Operation Anaconda (2002), in Afghanistan, Wiercinski (then a colonel) was commander of the 187th Infantry Regiment (a. k. a. "The Rakkasans"), 3rd Brigade, 101st Airborne Division (Air Assault).

He previously held a job as Senior Vice President and Managing Director of Asia-Pacific Region, Cubic Global Defense before joining Raytheon in 2020 as their Vice President for Missile Defense Requirements and Capabilities.

Awards and decorations

References

Living people
United States Army personnel of the Iraq War
United States Army personnel of the War in Afghanistan (2001–2021)
Recipients of the Distinguished Service Medal (US Army)
Recipients of the Defense Superior Service Medal
Recipients of the Legion of Merit
Recipients of the Order of the Rising Sun, 2nd class
United States Army generals
Recipients of the Humanitarian Service Medal
1956 births